Kyzyl-Abad is a village in the Osh Region of Kyrgyzstan. It is part of the Kara-Suu District. Its population was 1,673 in 2021.

References

Populated places in Osh Region